Inform - Educate - Entertain is the first album by alternative British group Public Service Broadcasting. It features samples from the British Film Institute (BFI) and The National Archives (UK) and features themes from the first expedition of Mount Everest, the invention of colour television, road safety, fashion, the creation of the Spitfire plane and Thomas Woodrooffe's 1937 radio broadcast at the Spithead Review. It peaked at No. 21 on the UK Albums Chart.

The album title is a reference to the original directive of the British Broadcasting Corporation.

Track listing

Personnel 
Musicians

 J. Willgoose, Esq. – guitars, bass, banjo, banjolele, mandola, sampling, keys, electronics, percussion badly, arrangements
 Wrigglesworth – drums, alto saxophone (track 11), cargo crowd shot photography
 Stephen Hackshaw – skilfully-constructed samples (tracks 3, 11)
 Robert Greenwood – flugelhorn, trumpet (tracks 6, 10)
 Ed Mills – french horn (tracks 6, 10)
 Owen Wales – trombone (tracks 6, 10)
 Andy Fell – tenor saxophone (track 11)

Production

 Gregor Reid – drums recording at Fonica Studios, Glasgow (tracks 1, 3, 4, 5, 7, 9, 11)
 Charlie Thomas – drums recording at Britannia Row Studios, London (track 2)
 Davide Venco – drums And brass recording At Britannia Row Studios, London (tracks 6, 10)
 Kate Kape – voiceover recording (track 11)
 Jamie Roberts – artwork
 Gerard Saint, Phil Armson – packaging and design
 Barry Gardner – mastering
 Mr Alex Toumazis – additional photography

Charts

Certifications

References

2013 debut albums
Public Service Broadcasting (band) albums